Elections to the French National Assembly were held in the Comoros on 23 June 1968. The result was a victory for the List for the French Republic, which won both seats. The seats were taken by Saïd Ibrahim Ben Ali and Mohamed Ahmed.

Results
Two independent candidates contested the election, Abdou Sidi Elface and Saïd Ali Youssouf.

References

Comoros
Elections in the Comoros
1968 in the Comoros
June 1968 events in Africa